The Pilgrim Stakes is a Grade II American Thoroughbred horse race for two-year-olds over a distance of  miles on the turf track scheduled annually in late September at Belmont Park in Elmont, New York. The event currently offers a purse of $200,000.

History

The event was inaugurated on 29 October 1979 at Aqueduct Racetrack and was run over the  mile distance in split divisions as the sixth and eighth race on the card that day.

The race is named for Joseph E. Widener's horse, Pilgrim, winner of the 1919 Remsen Stakes.

In 1982 the event was classified as Grade III, upgraded to Grade II in 1988 for two runnings before being downgraded to Grade III. From 2001–2007 the race was not graded as in 2009 when the event was moved off the turf track due to the inclement weather and held over a shorter one mile distance.

The event was run in two divisions in the above mentioned inaugural 1979 and again in 1983.

The distance of the event has been changed several times but since 2010 the event has been run over the current distance of  miles.

The race was part of the Breeders' Cup Challenge series from 2008 to 2010, when the winner automatically qualified for the Breeders' Cup Juvenile Turf.

The event was upgraded  to a Grade III event in 2020.

In 2022 the event was moved to Aqueduct Racetrack due to infield tunnel and redevelopment work at Belmont Park.

Records
Speed  record: 
 miles:  1:41.04 – Annapolis   (2021)
 miles:  1:48.02 – Volponi (2000)

Margins:
 12 lengths – Diplomatic Jet (1994)

Most wins by an owner:
 2 –  Live Oak Racing (1981, 2001)

Most wins by a jockey:
 5 – John Velazquez (1998, 1999, 2000, 2003, 2007)

Most wins by a trainer:
 5 –  Todd A. Pletcher (2007, 2009, 2017, 2021, 2022)

Winners

Legend:

 
 

Notes:

§ Ran as an entry

† Both divisions of the event were moved off the turf and onto the main track due to the inclement weather

See also
List of American and Canadian Graded races

References

1979 establishments in New York (state)
Horse races in New York (state)
Belmont Park
Flat horse races for two-year-olds
Turf races in the United States
Graded stakes races in the United States
Grade 3 stakes races in the United States
Recurring sporting events established in 1979